The Atlanta, Birmingham and Atlantic Railway was formed in 1914 as a reorganization of the Atlanta, Birmingham and Atlantic Railroad, which had been created in 1905 to purchase the Atlantic and Birmingham Railway and extend its track into Birmingham, Alabama, from an end point at Montezuma, Georgia. The railroad's chief engineer and general manager at the time was Alexander Bonnyman. 

The railroad went into receivership in 1921 and was acquired by the Atlantic Coast Line Railroad in 1926. They reorganized the line as the Atlanta, Birmingham and Coast Railroad.

The Mangum Street embankment which ran north–south along Mangum Street (parallel to today's Northside Drive, but two blocks to the east), upon which trains reached the Atlanta terminus west of Downtown Atlanta, was built in 1905 and razed c. 1990 for construction of the Georgia Dome.

The building was used as offices and passenger terminal for the AB&A in Atlanta is located at the corner of Fairlie and Walton Streets in downtown Atlanta. It is now used as offices for Central Atlanta Progress. The upper facade of the building retains the "Atlanta, Birmingham & Atlantic Railroad" stonework on two sides.

References

External links
Georgia's Railroads, History, and Heritage
Owen, Thomas McAdory.  History of Alabama and Dictionary of Alabama Biography, Vol. I.  Chicago:  S. J. Clarke Publishing, 1921, pp. 70-71.
 Atlanta, Birmingham & Atlantic Railroad Photograph Collection from the Atlanta History Center
Alexander Bonnyman Papers -- A collection of railroad records and photographs belonging to one of their chief engineers

Defunct Alabama railroads
Defunct Georgia (U.S. state) railroads
Former Class I railroads in the United States
Predecessors of the Atlantic Coast Line Railroad
Railway companies established in 1915
Railway companies disestablished in 1926
American companies established in 1915